KRGY (97.3 FM) is a radio station broadcasting a classic rock format. Licensed to Aurora, Nebraska, United States, the station serves the Grand Island-Kearney area.  The station is currently owned by Legacy Communications, LLC and features programming from ABC Radio.

On October 1, 2010, KRGY changed their format from hot adult contemporary to classic rock, branded as "The Wolf".

Previous logo
 (KRGY's previous "Star 97.3" logo)

References

External links

RGY